Cody Ford (born December 28, 1996) is an American football offensive guard for the Cincinnati Bengals of the National Football League (NFL). He played college football at Oklahoma.

College career
During his recruitment process, Ford originally committed to TCU before flipping to the Oklahoma Sooners.  After redshirting for the 2015 season, Ford started the first 3 games of 2016 for Oklahoma before suffering a broken fibula against Ohio State and missing the rest of the season.  During the 2018 season, Ford was named a third-team All American as part of an offensive line that won the Joe Moore Award.  Following this season, Ford announced that he would be declaring for the 2019 NFL Draft.  When he declared, Ford was ranked as the number 3 guard available by NFL Draft analyst Mel Kiper Jr.

Professional career

Buffalo Bills
Ford was drafted by the Buffalo Bills in the second round with the 38th overall pick in the 2019 NFL Draft.

Ford alternated between playing at guard and tackle during his rookie year, but saw more time at tackle after starter Ty Nsekhe suffered an ankle injury. During Buffalo's Wild Card Round playoff loss against the Houston Texans, Ford was called for an illegal blindside block as the Bills were driving into field goal range in overtime. The penalty played a part in Buffalo losing the game and has been seen as controversial. After Ford was later fined $28,075 by the league for the block, numerous Bills fans donated on GoFundMe in an attempt to help Ford cover the costs.

Ford entered the 2020 season as the Bills starting right guard. He moved over to left guard in Week 3 in place of Quinton Spain. He started the next four games there, before missing three of the next four games. Prior to Week 12, Ford suffered a torn meniscus in practice and was placed on injured reserve on November 28.

Arizona Cardinals
On August 22, 2022, the Buffalo Bills traded Ford to the Arizona Cardinals for a 2023 fifth-round pick. On September 10, 2022, he was placed on injured reserve after injuring his ankle at practice. He was activated on October 20.

Cincinnati Bengals
On March 16, 2023, Ford signed a one-year contract with the Cincinnati Bengals.

References

External links

Buffalo Bills bio
Oklahoma Sooners bio

1996 births
Living people
People from Pineville, Louisiana
Players of American football from Louisiana
American football offensive linemen
Oklahoma Sooners football players
Buffalo Bills players
Arizona Cardinals players
Cincinnati Bengals players
Sportspeople from Rapides Parish, Louisiana